Ocnogyna mutabilis is a moth of the family Erebidae. It was described by Turati in 1924. It is found in North Africa.

References

Spilosomina
Moths described in 1924